The following is a list of episodes of the A&E reality television series Shipping Wars.

Series Overview

Episodes

Season 1 (2012)

Season 2 (2012)

Season 3 (2012–13)

Season 4 (2013)

Season 5 (2013–14)

Season 6 (2014)

Season 7 (2014–15)

Season 8 (2015)

Season 9 (2021)

References

Lists of American reality television series episodes
Lists of American non-fiction television series episodes